Elias Kifon Bongmba (born 1953) is a Cameroonian-American theologian.

Biography
Bongmba received a BA from Sioux Falls College in 1987, an M.Div. from North American Baptist Seminary in Sioux Falls in 1989, an MA from the University of Iowa in 1991, and a Ph.D. from Iliff School of Theology in 1995. He is Professor of Religion at Rice University in Houston, Texas, and holds the Harry and Hazel Chair in Christian Theology. His research focuses on Global Christianity and African and African Diaspora religions. He currently serves as the editor of Journal of Religion in Africa, is a member of the American Academy of Religion, and is president of the African Association for the Study of Religion

Awards 
Elias Bongmba has received several awards over the years recognizing and honoring his contributions to his fields of study. In 2007 Bongmba was awarded the Frantz Fanon Prize, presented by the Caribbean Philosophical Association, for Outstanding Work in Caribbean Thought for his work Dialectics of Transformation in Africa. In 2020 Bongmba received the Ray L. Hart Service Award for his dedication to his field of study.

Works 
 Toward a Hermeneutic of Wimbum Tfu, (African Studies Review 41, no. 3,1998: 165–91)
African Witchcraft and Otherness: A Philosophical and Theological Critique of Intersubjective Relations, (SUNY Press, 2001).
On Love: Literary Images of A Phenomenology of Love in Ngugi Wa Thong'o's 'The River Between''',  (Literature and Theology 15, no. 4 (2001): 373–95)Fabian and Levinas on Time and the Other: Ethical Implications, (Philosophia Africana 4, no. 1 2001: 7–26.)Reflections on Thabo Mbekis African Renaissance, (Journal of Southern African Studies 30, no. 2, 2004)
 The Dialectics of Transformation in Africa, (Palgrave Macmillan, 2006)Facing a Pandemic: The African Church and the Crisis of AIDS, (Baylor University Press, 2007)Phenomenological Humanism: Lewis Gordon on Reclaiming the Human in an Anti-Human World, (The CLR James Journal 14, no. 1, 2008: 245–68)Beyond Reason to Interdisciplinary Dialogue on Morality and Politics in Africa: Comments on E. C. Eze’s ‘Between History and the Gods: Reason, Morality, and Politics in Today’s Africa, (Africa Today 55, no. 2, 2008: 98–104)A Comment on Friedman and Rossi’s Dialectical Theory and the Study of HIV/AIDS: A Broad Marxist Critique, (Dialectical Anthropology 35, no. 4, 2011: 443–47)The Wiley-Blackwell Companion to African Religions, (editor; Wiley, 2012)Responsibility and Governance, (Africa Institute of South Africa, 2013)Homosexuality and Otherness in the African Church, (Journal of Religion and Violence 4, no. 1, 2016: 15–38)Witchcraft as a Social Diagnosis: Traditional Ghanaian Beliefs and Global Health, (Lexington Books, 2017)Church, Disability, and Development: The Case of the Cameroon Baptist Convention Health Board, (Mzuni Press, 2019)Land Disputes and Family Ties in Cameroon: Debating the Possibilities of Reconciliation, (African Sun Media, 2019)What Has Kinshasa to Do with Athens?: Methodological Perspectives on Theology and Social Science in Search for a Political Theology'', (Brill, 2020)

References

1953 births
Living people
Cameroonian academics
Rice University faculty
Religious studies scholars
World Christianity scholars